Cruiser is a passenger vessel owned by Clyde Marine Services Ltd operating in the River Clyde as part of the company's charter cruise fleet. Her former names are Southsea Queen, Hythe Hotspur and Poole Scene.

History
Southsea Queen was built in 1974 by James & Stone of Brightlingsea for the Gosport Ferry Company for cruising and standby ferry duties. She was similar to Solent Enterprise, from the same shipyard but with a flared pointed bow. However, at 119 GRT she proved too small for her job and just four years later was sold to White Horse Ferries for use on its Hythe Ferry service. She was renamed Hythe Hotspur and repainted from her green with red band livery to a red and white livery.

She was withdrawn from this service in 1995 and chartered to Brownsea Island Ferries Ltd for service in Poole Harbour. She initially kept the name Hythe Hotspur but was later sold to Blue Funnel Cruises in 1997 and renamed Poole Scene. She sailed from Poole Quay until early 1998, when she returned to Southampton.

In 1999, she was sold to Clyde Marine Services and renamed Cruiser. As such, she operated as a charter cruise vessel out of Greenock, cruising the River and Firth of Clyde. This included the weekday Rosneath ferry service from Gourock to Kilcreggan on behalf of SPT, as a substitute vessel when  was out of service. In 2007 Clyde Marine introduced Seabus on this route, but in 2012 SPT accepted the tender from Clydelink for the service. 

Cruiser and Clyde Clipper are the two passenger vessels listed in Clyde Marine's fleet.

References

External links
Clyde Maritime Services Clyde Cruiser
Gosport Ferry
Hythe Ferry
Hythe Hotspur

Ferries of England
Ferries of Scotland
Gosport Ferry
1974 ships
Ships built in Essex